Third-seeded Nelly Landry defeated Shirley Fry 6–2, 0–6, 6–0 in the final to win the women's singles tennis title at the 1948 French Championships.

Seeds
The seeded players are listed below. Nelly Landry is the champion; others show the round in which they were eliminated.

  Doris Hart (semifinals)
  Patricia Todd (semifinals)
  Nelly Landry (champion)
  Shirley Fry (finalist)
  Zsuzsi Körmöczy (second round)
  Mary Prentiss (quarterfinals)
  Annalisa Bossi (quarterfinals)
  Helen Rihbany (quarterfinals)
  Colette Boegner (third round)
  Márta Peterdy (third round)
  Miriamme De Borman (third round)
  Jacqueline Patorni (third round)
  Alice Weiwers (second round)
  Bea Carris (third round)
  Arlette Halff (third round)
  Jaqueline Boutin (third round)

Draw

Key
 Q = Qualifier
 WC = Wild card
 LL = Lucky loser
 r = Retired

Finals

Earlier rounds

Section 1

Section 2

Section 3

Section 4

References

External links
  on the French Open website

1948 in women's tennis
1948
1948 in French women's sport
1948 in French tennis